Rose of Lima (born Isabel Flores de Oliva; 20 April 1586  24 August 1617) was a member of the Third Order of Saint Dominic in Lima, Peru, who became known for both her life of severe penance and her care of the poverty stricken of the city through her own private efforts. Rose of Lima was born to a noble family and is the patron saint of embroidery, gardening and cultivation of blooming flowers. A lay member of the Dominican Order, she was declared a saint by the Catholic Church, being the first person born in the Americas to be canonized as such.

As a saint, Rose of Lima has been designated as a co-patroness of the Philippines along with Pudentiana; both saints were moved to second-class patronage in September 1942 by Pope Pius XII, but Rose remains the primary patroness of Peru and of the local people of Latin America. Her image is featured on the highest denomination banknote of Peru.

Biography

She was born as Isabel Flores de Oliva in the city of Lima, then in the Viceroyalty of Peru, on 20 April 1586. His wife and Rose's mother, María de Oliva y Herrera (b. 1560), was a criolla native of Lima. Her maternal grandparents were Francisco de Oliva and Isabel de Herrera. Rose’s siblings (in birth order) were Gaspar, Bernardina, Hernando, Francisco, Juana, Antonio, Andrés, Francisco and Jacinta, all born in Lima.

Her later nickname "Rose" comes from an incident in her infancy: a servant claimed to have seen her face transform into a rose. In 1597 Isabel was confirmed by the Archbishop of Lima, Toribio de Mogrovejo, who was also to be declared a saint. She formally took the name of Rose (Rosa in Spanish) at that time.

As a young girl, in emulation of the noted Dominican tertiary Catherine of Siena, she began to fast three times a week and performed severe penances in secret. When she was admired for her beauty, Rose cut off her hair and rubbed pepper on her face, upset that men were beginning to take notice of her. She rejected all suitors against the objections of her friends and her family. Despite the censure of her parents, she spent many hours contemplating the Blessed Sacrament, which she received daily, an extremely rare practice in that period. She was determined to take a vow of virginity, which was opposed by her parents who wished her to marry. Finally, out of frustration, her father gave her a room to herself in the family home.

After daily fasting, she took to permanently abstaining from eating meat. She helped the sick and hungry around her community, bringing them to her room and taking care of them. Rose sold her fine needlework,  and took flowers that she grew to market, to help her family. She made and sold lace and embroidery to care for the poor, and she prayed and did penance in a little grotto that she had built. Otherwise, she became a recluse, leaving her room only for her visits to church.

She attracted the attention of the friars of the Dominican Order. She wanted to become a nun, but her father forbade it, so she instead entered the Third Order of St. Dominic while living in her parents' home. In her twentieth year she donned the habit of a tertiary and took a vow of perpetual virginity. She only allowed herself to sleep two hours a night at most, so that she had more hours to devote to prayer. She donned a heavy crown made of silver, with small spikes on the inside, in emulation of the Crown of Thorns worn by Christ.

For eleven years she lived this way, with intervals of ecstasy, and eventually died on 24 August 1617, at the young age of 31. It is said that she prophesied the date of her death. Her funeral was held in the cathedral, attended by all the public authorities of Lima. Her feast day is on the 23rd day of August (the 30th day of August in the Traditional calendar).

Veneration

Rose was beatified by Pope Clement IX on 10 May 1667, and canonized on 12 April 1671, by Pope Clement X, and was the first Catholic in the Americas to be declared a saint. Her shrine, alongside those of her friends Martin de Porres and John Macias, is currently located inside of the convent of Saint Dominic in Lima. The Catholic Church says that many miracles followed her death: there were stories that she had cured a leper, and that, at the time of her death, the city of Lima smelled like roses; roses also started falling from the sky. Many places in the New World are named Santa Rosa after her.

Her liturgical feast was inserted into the General Roman Calendar in 1729 for celebration initially on 30 August, because 24 August, the date of her death, is the feast of Saint Bartholomew the Apostle and 30 August was the closest date not already allocated to a well-known saint. Pope Paul VI's 1969 revision of the calendar made 23 August available, the day on which her feast day is now celebrated throughout the world, including Spain, but excluding Peru and some other Latin American countries, where 30 August is a public holiday in her honor.

Early lives of Rosa were written by the Dominican Father Hansen, "Vita Sanctae Rosae" (2 vols., Rome, 1664–1668), and Vicente Orsini, afterward. Pope Benedict XIII wrote "Concentus Dominicano, Bononiensis ecclesia, in album Sanctorum Ludovici Bertrandi et Rosae de Sancta Maria, ordinero praedicatorum" (Venice, 1674).

There is a park named for her in downtown Sacramento, California. A plot of land at 7th and K streets was given to the Catholic Church by Peter Burnett, first Governor of the State of California. Father Peter Anderson built one of the first of two churches in the diocese to be consecrated under the patronage of St. Rose.

In the Caribbean twin-island state of Trinidad and Tobago, the Santa Rosa Carib Community, located in Arima, is the largest organization of indigenous peoples on the island. The second oldest parish in the Diocese of Port of Spain is also named after this saint. The Santa Rosa Church, which is located in the town of Arima, was established on 20 April 1786, as the Indian Mission of Santa Rosa de Arima, on the foundations of a Capuchin Mission previously established in 1749.

On the Caribbean Island of Saint Lucia there are two flower festivals supported by their Societies.  Each society has a patron saint on whose feast day the grande fete is celebrated. For the Roses it is the feast of St. Rose of Lima on 30 August; and for the Marguerites it is that of St. Margaret Mary Alacoque, 17 October.

Rose's skull, surmounted with a crown of roses, is on public display at the Basilica in Lima, Peru, along with that of Martin de Porres. It was customary to keep the torso in the basilica and pass the head around the country.

She is also commemorated on 24 August in some places.

Patronage
Saint Rose is the patroness of the Americas, the indigenous people of the Americas, and of Peru, especially the city of Lima, Sittard in the Netherlands, of the Indies, and of the Philippines.

Legacy
On the last weekend in August, the Fiesta de Santa Rosa is celebrated in Dixon, New Mexico, and the Sint Rosa Festival in Sittard, Limburg, Netherlands. Also, in Sibbe, Limburg, Netherlands a maypole dedicated to saint Rose is erected on the first saturday after the 23rd of August by the local Jonkheid.

A barony of Saint Rose of Lima was created in the Royal House of Rwanda on 25 July 2016 by the Catholic king in exile, King Kigeli V of Rwanda.

Maywood, California, contains the largest parish dedicated to Saint Rose. 

Dedicated parishes are located in:

Asia
 Cherai, Kerala, India
 Anayan, Pili, Camarines Sur, Philippines
 Bagong Ilog and Sumilang, Pasig, Philippines
 Santa Rosa City, Laguna, Philippines
 Santa Rosa, Nueva Ecija, Philippines
 Santa Rosa de Lima, Alcoy, Cebu, Philippines
 Santa Rosa de Lima, Daanbantayan, Cebu, Philippines
 St. Rose of Lima, Teresa, Rizal, Philippines

Australia
 Kapunda, South Australia, Australia
 Collaroy Plateau, New South Wales, Australia
 Rosedale, Victoria, Australia

Europe
 Sittard, Limburg, Netherlands
 Sibbe - IJzeren, Limburg, Netherlands
 Weoley Castle, Birmingham, UK

North America

Toronto, Ontario, Canada 
 Sooke, British Columbia, Canada
 Sainte Rose du Lac, Manitoba, Canada
 Santa Rosa de Juarez, Oaxaca, Mexico
 Safford, Arizona, United States
 Chula Vista, California, United States
 Crockett, California, United States
 Maywood, California, United States
 Paso Robles, California, United States
 Roseville, California, United States
 Santa Rosa, California, United States
 Simi Valley, California, United States
 Buena Vista, Colorado, United States
 Newtown, Connecticut, United States
 Milton, Florida, United States
 Miami Shores, Florida, United States
 Montrose, Illinois, United States
 Quincy, Illinois, United States
 Franklin, Indiana, United States
 Denison, Iowa, United States
 Great Bend, Kansas, United States
 Cloverport, Kentucky, United States
 Springfield, Kentucky, United States
 Jay, Maine, United States
 Baltimore, Maryland, United States
 Gaithersburg, Maryland, United States
 Chelsea, Massachusetts, United States
 Chicopee, Massachusetts, United States
 Northborough, Massachusetts, United States
 Topsfield, Massachusetts, United States
 Hastings, Michigan, United States
 Roseville, Minnesota, United States
 De Soto, Missouri, United States
 Dillon, Montana, United States
 Reno, Nevada, United States
 Littleton, New Hampshire, United States
 Belmar, New Jersey, United States
 East Hanover, New Jersey, United States
 Haddon Heights, New Jersey, United States
 Freehold, New Jersey, United States
 Short Hills, New Jersey, United States
 Forestville, New York, United States
 Lima, New York, United States
 Massapequa, New York, United States
 New York, New York, United States
 North Syracuse, New York, United States
 Rockaway Beach, Queens, New York, United States
 Hillsboro, North Dakota, United States
 Perry, Oklahoma, United States
 Cincinnati, Ohio, United States
 St. Rose, Ohio, United States
 Perrysburg, Ohio, United States
 Lima, Ohio, United States
 Altoona, Pennsylvania, United States
 Carbondale, Pennsylvania, United States
 Eddystone, Pennsylvania, United States
 Dillon, Montana, United States
 North Wales, Pennsylvania, United States
 York, Pennsylvania, United States
 Murfreesboro, Tennessee, United States
 Andice, Texas, United States
 Houston, Texas, United States
 San Antonio, Texas, United States
 Cheney, Washington, United States
 Cuba City, Wisconsin, United States
 Milwaukee, Wisconsin, USA
 Benavides, Texas, United States

South America
 Basilica Santuario de Santa Rosa de Lima Buenos Aires, Argentina
 Santa Rosa Church, Paramaribo, Suriname.

 Arima, Trinidad and Tobago
 Lima, Perú

Central America and Caribbean
 Rincón, Puerto Rico
 Venus Gardens, San Juan, Puerto Rico
 Santa Rosa, Colón, Panamá

Gallery

See also

 List of Catholic saints

References

Further reading

 José Flores Araoz, et al. Santa Rosa de Lima y su tiempo. Lima: Banco de Crédito del Perú 1995.
 Manuscript of the Life of St. Rose of Lima
 Luis Getino, O.P. Santa Rosa de Lima, patrona de América: su retrato corporal y su talla intelectual según nuevos documentos. Madrid: M. Aguilar 1943.
 Teodoro Hampe Martínez. "Santa Rosa de Lima y la identidad criolla en el Perú colonial" (essay of interpretation), Revista de Historia de América, No. 121 (January – December, 1996), pp. 7–26
 Leonardo Hansen, Vida admirable de Santa Rosa de Lima, translated by Fr. Jacinto Parra. Lima: Centro Católico 1895.
 Fernando Iwasaki Canti. "Mujeres borde de la perfección: Rosa de Santa María y las alumbradas de Lima," Hispanic American Historical Review 73, no. 4 (1993):581–613.
 Pedro de Loayza, O.P. Vida ad Santa Rosa de Lima (1619) Reprint, Lima: Iberia, S.A. 1965.
 Ronald J. Morgan, "Heretics by Sea, Pagans by Land: St. Rosa de Lima and the Limits of Criollismo in Colonial Peru", chapter 4 of Spanish American Saints and the Rhetoric of Identity. Tucson: University of Arizona Press 2002, pp. 67–97.
 Tomás Polvorosa López, "La canonización de Santa Rosa de Lima a través del Bullarium Ordinis F.F. Pratedictorum" in Actas del I Congreso Internacional sobre los Dominicos y el Nuevo Mundo, pp. 603–639. Madrid: Editorial DEIMoS 1987.
 Marian Storm. "The Life of St. Rose: First American Saint and Only American Woman Saint", 
 Rubén Vargas Ugarte, S.J. Vida de Santa Rosa de Lima. 3d edition. Buenos Aires: Imprenta López 1961.

1586 births
1617 deaths
People from Lima
16th-century Peruvian people
17th-century Peruvian people
17th-century Christian mystics
Dominican tertiaries
Lay Dominicans
Burials in Peru
Peruvian Roman Catholic saints
16th-century Christian saints
17th-century Christian saints
Dominican mystics
Dominican saints
Christian female saints of the Early Modern era
Christian vegetarianism
16th-century women
17th-century women
Peruvian people of Spanish descent
Peruvian people of indigenous peoples descent
Indigenous Roman Catholic saints of the Americas
Canonizations by Pope Clement X
Beatifications by Pope Clement IX